Ocean governance  is the conduct of the policy, actions and affairs regarding the world's oceans. Within governance, it incorporates the influence of non-state actors, i.e. stakeholders, NGOs and so forth, therefore the state is not the only acting power in policy making. However, ocean governance is complex because much of the ocean is a commons that is not ‘owned’ by any single person or nation/state. There is a belief more strongly in the US than other countries that the “invisible hand” is the best method to determine ocean governance factors. These include factors such as what resources we consume, what price we should pay for them, and how we should use them. The underlying reasoning behind this is the market has to have the desire in order to promote environmental protection, however this is rarely the case. This term is referred to as a market failure. Market failures and government failures are the leading causes of ocean governance complications. As a result, humankind has tended to overexploit marine resources, by treating them as shared resources while not taking equal and collective responsibilities in caring for them.

Effective ocean governance requires robust international agreements. In short, there is a need for some form of governance to maintain the ocean for its various uses, preferably in a sustainable manner. Over the years, a number of international treaties have been signed in order to regulate international ocean governance. Current international policy goals to create more sustainable relations with the ocean are captured in Sustainable Development Goal 14 "life below sea".

Legal framework

There are two major international legal organizations that are involved in ocean governance on a global scale, the International Maritime Organization and the UNCLOS. The International Maritime Organization (IMO), which was ratified in 1958 is responsible mainly for maritime safety, liability and compensation and they have held some conventions on marine pollution related to shipping incidents.

IMO marine pollution conventions

 1972 – Convention on the Prevention of Marine Pollution by Dumping of Wastes and Other Matter (LDC)
 1969 – International Convention Relating to Intervention on the High Seas in Cases of Oil Pollution Casualties (INTERVENTION).
 1973 – International Convention for the Prevention of Pollution from Ships, as modified by the Protocol of 1978 relating thereto (MARPOL 73/78).
 1990 – International Convention on Oil Pollution Preparedness, Response, and Cooperation (OPRC).
 2000 – Protocol on Preparedness, Response and Cooperation to Pollution Incidents by Hazardous and Noxious Substances (HNS Protocol).

The IMO sees the regulation of marine pollution as one of its most important responsibilities. In particular, the MARPOL convention is regarded as one of its greatest successes. The result of MARPOL has meant that oil pollution has decreased due to a change in equipment standards of oil tankers to prevent operational discharge of oil.
However, the main organisation concerned with the economic, environmental, ethical, peace and security issues is the United Nations Convention on the Law of the Sea (UNCLOS).

United Nations Convention on the Law of the Sea (UNCLOS)

UNCLOS was first established under the Third UNCLOS in 1973 and fully ratified in 1982. The main aim was to adopt a regime of national seas and international waters on a global scale. It was agreed that the jurisdictional boundaries of individual states were to be enlarged to 200 nautical miles off a state’s coastline. Coastal states were given greater rights to control these areas for protective purposes and the exploitation of natural resources. In total 38 million square nautical miles of ocean space was put under jurisdiction under the exclusive economic zones (EEZ) and the legal framework concerning the continental shelf and territorial sea were altered.

However, the Convention did not come into full effect despite some progress between 1973 and 1982. This was mainly due to a dispute over mineral resources, particularly manganese nodules in the deep-oceans. Developing countries preferred treating these minerals as “common heritage,” that via an international organization would allow them to benefit from a sharing of these resources. However, the developed world, in particular the United States, was not in favor of this and preferring a first-come, first-served approach, with some suggesting this position was based on self-economic interest. Only in 1994 did the United States renounce their objections so that the Convention could be enacted.

Institutions established by UNCLOS

 International Seabed Authority (ISA) – An independent international institution that came into force in 1994, with the aim of acting as a custodian of ocean commons (the Common Heritage of Mankind). However its main purpose is to regulate deep seabed mining.
 Commission on the Limits of the Continental Shelf (CLCS) – Assists states in affairs to do with the establishment of outer limits of their continental shelf.
 Regime for the Peaceful Settlement of Disputes and the International Tribunal for the Law of the Sea (ITLOS) – This was established to handle disputes with the application and interpretations of UNCLOS.
 The Meeting of the State Parties (SPLOS) - carried out to conform with the article 319, paragraph 2 (e) to the LOSC Convention and is concerned with administrative matters.

Participatory Governance in Ocean Governance

In addition to international bodies managing ocean resources, it has been argued that sustainable governance depends on participatory decision making. Participatory governance was first highlighted in Agenda 21, signed at the UNCED (United Nations Conference on Environment and Development) in Rio de Janeiro in 1992. It was stated that:
“One of the fundamental prerequisites for the achievement of sustainable development is broad public participation in decision-making.”

Agenda 21 clearly states that the public needs to be more actively involved in environmental governance, along with the other stakeholders and authoritative bodies. This notion stems from the democratic principles whereby people are empowered to choose their own government and have input into policies affecting their lives. With the inclusion of people in a decision-making process, policy legitimacy improves.

Ocean governance depends on scientific knowledge, but often “lay-knowledge” is equally important for resource management, for example in a fishery. By relying on public participation, it's possible to come to an equitable environmental decision with the community in mind.

Since participatory governance can be time and resource-intensive, it is challenging to expand this approach to regional levels and beyond. It is also important to carefully consider which stakeholders to involve, as there may be a ‘participation paradox’. This paradox suggests that as the number of stakeholders increases in decision making, the involvement of each one and their effectiveness may be reduced in the process.

Importance of Participatory Governance to Integrated Coastal and Ocean Management in Canada (ICOM)

In 2002, Canada introduced the Oceans Strategy, which was heavily based on participatory governance principles: 
''“The governance model proposed for Integrated Management is one of collaboration. It involves ocean management decisions based on shared information, on consultation with stakeholders, and on their advisory or management participation in the planning process. It is also based on institutional arrangements that bring together all stakeholders. Participants take an active part in designing, implementing and monitoring the effectiveness of coastal and ocean management plans, and partners enter into agreements on ocean management plans with specific responsibilities, powers and obligations. It is also recognized that in specific cases, Integrated Management and planning may be achieved through co-management.”

Case Study: The Eastern Scotian Shelf Integrated Management (ESSIM) Initiative

The aim of the ESSIM Initiative is to create integrated and adaptive management plans that are a collaborative effort for ecosystem, social, economic and institutional sustainability of the Eastern Scotian Shelf. It incorporates maintaining existing jurisdictional responsibilities, inclusion, consensus, accountability, dispute resolution, networking, evolution, and learning by doing, which are all part of the governance principles in the Oceans Strategy.

The ESSIM relies on the Stakeholders Roundtable (lead stakeholders and government) and the Planning Office drafting up a management plan which is then reviewed at the ESSIM Forum (an annual stakeholders’ meeting), community meetings and the general public. Overall, an agreement then must be reached with the Stakeholder Roundtable and a final plan given to appropriate federal and provincial government agencies, before acquiring final approval under the Oceans Act. It has been seen as fairly successful in improving communication and cooperation within government agencies, but there is room for greater inclusion of coastal community participation to fully fulfill the participatory theory.

Levels of implementation

Ocean governance can be carried out at a local, national, regional or international level. However, there needs to be a link between all levels of implementation for “good” ocean governance to grow from participatory governance at these different levels. However organizations frequently lack authority and instruments to guarantee compliance and enforcement of these laws.

Local
Community-based management is featured in the Principle 22. This Declaration highlights that states need to recognize the importance that Indigenous and local communities play in sustainable environmental policy making. Also the stakeholders should play a responsible role with the government in a form of co-management to manage ocean resources. The stakeholders should play a responsible role for the government in a form of co-management to manage the ocean as the Community-based management in the Rio Declaration on Environment and Development recognizes the importance of community based play. In addition, the local communities should also be given a role of management for sustainable environmental policy making.

National

At a national level, ocean governance depends on an integrated management process within one state. Such processes depend on the engagement and cooperation of all government ministries with functions or authority related to ocean sectors. Ocean issues may be low on a political agenda, therefore successful integrated ocean policy requires political leadership and oversight. Because ocean governance depends on the integrated management process within one state, the engagement of all corporations and government ministries should function at a national level with focus directed to the oceans. The issue of ocean development at a national level is currently low on a political agenda as mentioned above, but for there to be a successful integration of ocean policies leading to developments, the oversight in creating new structures and integrations must be sustainable.

Regional

At this scale, the scope of challenges expands and greater numbers of organizations have jurisdiction. The Regional Seas Programme of UNEP creates programs to be managed and coordinated by countries that share a common body of water. These Action Plans range from chemical waste to conservation of marine ecosystems. These however need to be strengthened along with The Global Programme of Action for the Protection of the Marine Environment from Land-based Activities (GPA).

To be effective Regional Development Banks (RDBs) and Regional Governmental Organizations (RGOs) participate to provide reinforcement to national organizations.

International

The General Assembly of the United Nations is seen as the leading international body for global ocean governance. It functions with the Secretary General making recommendations through the Consultative Process of ocean matters and the Law of the Sea, which are then annually reviewed by The General Assembly. At this scale, the international body for global ocean governance is responsible for reducing pressure on the oceans and seas and creating the conditions for a sustainable blue economy.

Examples of marine resource governance

Fishing
Fishing is a vitally important activity, linked to food security. In 2009, 79.9 million tonnes of fish were caught from marine environments.  The FAO has stated that over half (53%) of fish stocks are at full exploitation, with current catches close to the maximum sustainable production levels. Therefore, there is a need for improved international and national policies. While approximately 99% of all fishery resources are within national jurisdiction, overexploitation continues.

Since the mid-1980s, numerous fishery organizations emerged but struggle to prevent global overfishing. There are problems with illegal fishing vessels violating fisheries laws, misreporting catches to authorities or fishing outside their proper jurisdiction. Illegal fishing frequently targets certain fish species with a high economic value, for example Bluefin Tuna.

Poor fishery management may be overcome by transitioning to rights-based fishing and self-governance, which incorporates participatory governance approaches. For this approach to work, there needs to be financial incentives that align with sustainability goals. Under such policies, ‘shares’ are distributed between the shareholders (individual/corporation, community or fishers’ collective) that are linked directly to the productivity and value of the resource. Consequently shareholders appreciate the resource more and overfishing may be reduced. When shareholders have an individual fishery share that they depend on and benefit from, competition may be reduced and sustainability improved.

There is a focus on rights-based approaches in current development programs, which have an emphasis on creating (or recreating) and supporting local institutions for the fishery. While rights may result in economic benefits, there is a possibility of monopolization by larger and powerful shareholders that will squeeze out small-scaled operations. While it may be more equitable for fisher folk to have more rights, they may lack the skills to manage fisheries information, assessment, management and negotiation; and they also lack sufficient funding to carry out these roles.

An alternative approach has been introducing market incentives to encourage sustainable fishing. The Marine Stewardship Council (MSC) introduced such incentives through a fishery certification program, with the incentive that the consumer will buy fish only caught by sustainable fisheries. This in turn creates a cycle that encourages the producer to abide by sustainable practices. To date (December 2011) there are currently 135 certified fisheries in the MSC Program.

Plastic Pollution 
The proliferation of synthetic plastics and  polymers continues to cause devastation to marine life. However, regulation can expedite the removal of plastic pollution from the marketplace. Historically, the use of chemicals, such as coolants in refrigerators under The Montreal Protocol, has been successfully reversed by employing rapid environmental policy. Similar policy, such as the Save Our Seas Act, has been used to regulate macroplastics, but now a call to action is needed in regulating microplastic and nanoplastic pollution. While the policy is limited, there are a few examples including the Microbead-Free Waters Act and the Ocean Protection Council: Statewide Microplastics Strategy.

There are even studies that have demonstrated the toxic effects of microplastics on our oceans and marine organisms such as phytoplankton, but many of them did not produce studies using environmentally relevant levels of the pollutant, and no studies have been published assessing the combined toxicity of microplastics and harmful chemicals such as UV filters. In order to accurately predict and manage risk, we need further studies on plastic pollution and harmful chemicals impact on marine life. Priority should be given to large scale, rapid screening of common organic pollutants and realistically weathered micro and nanoplastics to replicate oceanic conditions as  closely as  is possible in an ecotoxicological assay. Detailed studies aimed at the size and concentration of plastics and other emerging contaminants in the ocean are thus highly valuable to inform risk to coastal communities and the environment once they deposit.

Microplastic prevalence is overwhelmingly documented in the scientific literature yet has been the recipient of limited policy action. However, macroplastic pollution policy has some success in the US and abroad, and we can use similar methodology to incite interest in the implementation of policy directed towards the reduction and prevention of microplastic pollution.

See also
 The United Nations Ocean Conference
 Ocean colonization
 Ocean Development

References

Oceans
International law